Lucitanib (INN) is a drug that is being investigated by Clovis Oncology in clinical trials for the treatment of advanced solid tumours including metastatic breast cancer. It is a protein kinase inhibitor that blocks the VEGF receptors 1, 2 and 3, as well as the fibroblast growth factor receptors 1 and 2, and the platelet-derived growth factor receptors alpha and beta.

References 

Receptor tyrosine kinase inhibitors
Carboxamides
Experimental cancer drugs